Leonard Bradbury (July 1914 – 2007) was an English footballer. His regular position was as a forward. He was born in Northwich, Cheshire. He played for Manchester United, Old Wittonians, Northwich Victoria, and University of Manchester.

External links

MUFCInfo.com profile

1914 births
2007 deaths
English footballers
Manchester United F.C. players
Northwich Victoria F.C. players
Sportspeople from Northwich
Association football forwards